A by-election was held in the Dáil Éireann Roscommon–South Leitrim constituency in Ireland on Friday, 10 October 2014, following the election of Independent Teachta Dála (TD) Luke 'Ming' Flanagan to the European Parliament.

The Dublin South-West by-election was held on the same date. The Electoral (Amendment) Act 2011 stipulates that a by-election in Ireland must be held within six months of a vacancy occurring.

Independent candidate Michael Fitzmaurice was elected on the seventh count.

Result

See also
List of Dáil by-elections
Dáil constituencies

References

2014 Roscommon-South Leitrim by-election
2014 in Irish politics
31st Dáil
By-elections in the Republic of Ireland
Elections in County Leitrim
Elections in County Roscommon
October 2014 events in Ireland